The Secret Carrier (German: Der Geheimnisträger) is a 1975 West German comedy film directed by Franz Josef Gottlieb and starring Willy Millowitsch, Brigitte Mira and Sybil Danning.

Location shooting took place in Rhodes.

Synopsis
A mild-manner Cologne accountant is recruited to take part in a secret mission.

Cast
 Willy Millowitsch as Buchhalter Kuno Hopfen
 Gunther Philipp as Drusus Malz
 Brigitte Mira as Betty Hopfen
 Sybil Danning as Tanja
 Jürgen Scheller as Mann mit den zehn Gesichtern
 Hansi Kraus as Curd Bergmann
 Jutta Speidel as Lisa Hopfen
 Peter Millowitsch as Ferdinand Platz
 Alexander Allerson as Dr. Dregger
 Walter Ullrich as Dr. Herms
 Barbara Assmann as  Luise Platz
 Gernot Duda as Agent ZZ
 Theo Lingen as Dr. Thoms
 Eddi Arent as Wiesbach
 Heinz Reincke as Pitter

References

Bibliography
 Bock, Hans-Michael & Bergfelder, Tim. The Concise CineGraph. Encyclopedia of German Cinema. Berghahn Books, 2009.

External links 
 

1975 films
1975 comedy films
German comedy films
West German films
1970s German-language films
Films directed by Franz Josef Gottlieb
Constantin Film films
Films shot in Greece
1970s German films